El juego de la vida (English: The game of life) is a Mexican telenovela produced by Roberto Gómez Fernández and Giselle Gonález Salgado for Televisa. It premiered on November 12, 2001 and ended on June 28, 2002.

Sara Maldonado and Valentino Lanús star as protagonists; Ana Layevska, Margarita Magaña, Ingrid Martz, and Jackie García star as co-protagonists, while Raquel Pankowsky, Cristián Seri, Rodrigo Mejía, Maki Soler, and Raúl Araiza starred as antagonists.

Plot 
Lorena, the more focused of the group, is a cute girl with a good heart. When she returns to school, Lorena's longtime boyfriend, Mariano, leaves her after he confesses that he loves her supposed best friend Tania.

Lorena runs home crying, and when she crosses the street, she clashes with Juan Carlos Domínguez, who falls in love with her at first sight.

Paulina, is a beautiful, sweet girl with a good heart, but also suffers from the death of her mother, who is actually alive, but her father and her aunt make her believe she died. Paulina's father shows little interest in her.

Fernanda is a wild shrinking girl who does not believe in love and can't control her nerves sometimes.

Daniela is a young innocent girl who gets her heart broken by her boyfriend Tono who suffers from a car accident and goes blind. Tono doesn’t want Daniela to spend her life suffering and looking out for him so he ends up breaking up with her.

Cast 

Valentino Lanús as Juan Carlos "Juan Charlie" Domínguez
Ana Layevska as Paulina "Pau" de la Mora Miraban
Margarita Magaña as Fernanda "Fer" Pacheco
Sara Maldonado as Lorena "Lore" Álvarez
Jackie García as Daniela "Dany" Duarte
Luis Gimeno as Nicolás "Don Nico" Domínguez "Abuelo"
Manuel "Flaco" Ibáñez as Augusto Vidal
Silvia Mariscal as Sara Domínguez "Doña Sara"
Lucero Lander as Lucía Álvarez
Ingrid Martz as Georgina "Gina" Rivero Fuentes Guerra
Miguel Ángel Biaggio as Antonio "Toño" Pacheco
Maki Soler as Tania Vidal
Mauricio Barcelata as Mariano Alarcón
Patricio Borghetti as Patricio "Pato"
Tina Romero as Mercedes "Meche" Pacheco
David Ostrosky as Rafael Duarte
Juan Carlos Colombo as Ignacio de la Mora
Raquel Morell as Consuelo Duarte
Rafael Amador as Genaro Pacheco
Mariana Karr as Victoria "Vicky" Vidal
Ofelia Cano as Eugenia Robles
Raquel Pankowsky as Bertha de la Mora
Héctor Sáez as Braulio Zúñiga
Otto Sirgo as Javier Álvarez
Gabriela Cano as Araceli "Ñoña" Fuentes
Sergio Ochoa as Carmelo "Carmelito" Sánchez
Luciano Seri as Diego Santillán
Alexandra Monterrubio as Cinthia "Cin" Linares
Cristián Seri as Oscar Santillán
Juan Carlos Martín del Campo as Andrés Miranda
Raul Araiza as Ezequiel Domínguez
María Fernanda Malo as Marisol Duarte
Ilan Arditti as Adrián
Diana Osorio as Carmen "Carmelita" Pérez
Rodrigo Mejía as Fabián
Miguel Ángel Santa Rita as Simón Robles
Graciela Bernardos as Camila de la Mora
Jorge Veytia as Artemio / "Chemo"
Ivonne Montero as Carola Lizardi #1
Yessica Salazar as Carola Lizardi #2
Fátima Torre as Fátima Álvarez
Diego Sieres as Alberto "Beto" Duarte
Polly as Leticia Guzmán
Paola Flores as Pachis
Ricardo Vera as Bernal
Adalberto Parra as El Risueño
Carlos Amador as Santos
Fernando Moya as Manuel
Horacio Castelo as Mancera
Joshua Tacher as Roque"
Miguel Garza as Luis
Ingrid Macossay - as Gladys

References

External links
 at esmas.com 

2001 telenovelas
Mexican telenovelas
2001 Mexican television series debuts
2002 Mexican television series endings
Spanish-language telenovelas
Television shows set in Mexico City
Television shows set in Tokyo
Televisa telenovelas